Adel Tankova (born 22 May 2000) is an Israeli Olympic figure skater. She competed for Israel at the 2018 Winter Olympics with Ronald Zilberberg in Figure Skating in ice dancing and a team event in Pyeongchang, South Korea.

Early and personal life
Tankova was born in Dnipro (formerly known as Dnipropetrovsk), Ukraine, and is Jewish.  Her hometown is Hackensack, New Jersey.

Figure skating career
Tankova began skating in 2004. Her former partner in pairs was Evgeni Krasnopolski. Her current partner is Ronald Zilberberg, with whom she began competing in 2016. Her coach and choreographer is Galit Chait Moracci.

In 2017/2018, the pair won the Israeli National Championship, and came in 28th in the ISU European Ice Dance Championship.

Tankova and Zilberberg competed for Israel at the 2018 Winter Olympics in Figure Skating in ice dancing and a team event in Pyeongchang, South Korea.  They scored 46.66 in the short dance event for an overall finish of 24th place.

References

2000 births
Living people
Sportspeople from Dnipro
Sportspeople from Hackensack, New Jersey
Figure skaters at the 2018 Winter Olympics
Israeli female ice dancers
Olympic figure skaters of Israel
Ukrainian emigrants to the United States
Jewish Ukrainian sportspeople
Jewish Israeli sportspeople
Israeli people of Ukrainian-Jewish descent